The 1997-98 Serbian Hockey League season was the seventh season of the Serbian Hockey League, the top level of ice hockey in Serbia (then the Federal Republic of Yugoslavia). Five teams participated in the league, and HK Vojvodina Novi Sad won the championship.

Regular season

Playoffs

Semifinals
HC TAS Novigrad Belgrade – HK Vojvodina Novi Sad (10–9, 1–4)
Partizan Belgrade – KHK Crvena Zvezda (1–4, 4–13)

Final
HK Vojvodina Novi Sad – KHK Crvena Zvezda (6–1, 4–2)

External links
Season on hockeyarchives.info

Serbian Hockey League
Serbian Hockey League seasons
Serb